Ryan Sheridan is an Irish singer, songwriter and guitarist from County Monaghan.

Early life

Sheridan started playing the fiddle at the age of seven and played Irish traditional music with Comhaltas for several years. At the age of 16 he left Ireland to perform as a dancer with the Riverdance ensemble. He toured the US with Riverdance for four years and then spent two years performing at the Gershwin Theatre on Broadway. Sheridan started writing music and playing guitar while living in New York City, and in 2004 Ryan moved to Glasgow to form the rockband Shiversaint. He returned to Ireland in 2006 and met Polish percussionist and cajon player Artur Graczyk who joined the band. When the band split, Sheridan took a two-year break from music to run a venue in his hometown of Monaghan.

Music career
Sheridan and Graczyk were discovered in Dublin by their future manager, Brian Whitehead on 23 March 2010. When Whitehead saw them playing a cover of Little Lion Man by Mumford and Sons in Grafton Street, he stopped and listened for ten minutes before he dropped his card in Sheridan's guitar case. Whitehead nominated Sheridan's song Machine for the SupaJam competition to win the opportunity to play at the Festival Internacional de Benicàssim in Spain. Sheridan won the competition beating out 3,226 other entries. He played on the Eastpak FIB Club Stage on 17 July.

After a showcase at The Academy in Dublin, he got a record deal with Rubyworks Records and his first single Jigsaw (produced by Billy Farrell) was released in September 2010. Jigsaw was an immediate hit on Irish radio and on iTunes. In December 2010, Sheridan played his first headline tour around Ireland. He also appeared on Other Voices on RTÉ Two television in Ireland. Two songs from this performance was released on the album Other Voices: Series 9, Vol 3 (Live) on 30 August 2013.

2011

Ryan Sheridan started the year with an appearance on The Late Late Show on 21 January. On 6 May 2011 Sheridan released his debut album, The Day You Live Forever in Ireland with leading Irish independent label Rubyworks, who licensed the album to Universal Music Germany. The album reached platinum sales status in Ireland. More recently Sheridan has joined Rea Garvey as special guest on his European tour.

Sheridan's debut album contained the singles "Jigsaw", "The Dreamer" and "Stand Up Tall". The album debuted at number two on the Irish Albums Chart and was certified with gold sales after five weeks. It was produced by Joe Chester and all the songs on the album were composed by Sheridan.

Sheridan was a featured artist at the Concert for Obama on College Green in May 2011 and is an ambassador for the Make-A-Wish Foundation, Ireland.

On 17 September 2011, Sheridan was the first artist to play Croke Park and Aviva Stadium on the same day. He also played two songs during the 2011 All-Ireland Senior Football Championship Final in Croke Park on 18 September 2011.

Sheridan's concert in The Academy on 5 November 2011 was his biggest Dublin show to date. Support acts were singer/songwriter Sara Lou and Consumer Love Affair, with a guest performance by Crowded House bass guitarist Nick Seymour and Tomas Cosinski on guitar. Halfway through the concert Graczyk switched from playing cajon to drums and bass guitarist Neil Dorrington joined the band.

On 25 November 2011, Ryan released a four-track Christmas EP Walking in the Air, with all profits from the sales of the single being donated to Make-A-Wish Ireland. The single was in the top ten of the Irish Singles Chart for Christmas 2011. On 23 December Ryan visited The Late Late Show on RTÉ Television for the second time and the same evening "Walking in the Air" was number one on the Irish iTunes charts.

Sheridan's video Stand Up Tall directed by Simon Eustace was nominated for best male video 2011 by IMTV – Irish Music Television.

2012
Sheridan's song Take It All Back from The Day You Live Forever featured on Raw (TV series) season 4, episode 1 on RTÉ One. In January his track The Dreamer provided the soundtrack to a Heineken commercial. At the beginning of 2012 guitarist Nicky Brennan joined Ryan Sheridan's band. In March Ryan appeared on Bernard Dunne's RTÉ Bród Club performing The Day You Live Forever as gaeilge.

On 20 April, Sheridan was presented with a platinum plaque for his debut album, The Day You Live Forever, at his sold-out show in The Olympia Theatre, Dublin. Sheridan played his first London show at the Hard Rock Calling festival in Hyde Park on 15 July. Later on 27 September, Sheridan played a headline performance at The Palace Nightclub on Camden Street in Dublin as part of their Arthur's Day Celebrations.

On 1 November 2012, Ryan signed an international record deal with Universal Music Germany. He followed this with headline appearances at GiftedLive.com at Monroes in Galway on 22 November and at Monto Water Rats in London.

2013

Sheridan began 2013 with a heavy tour schedule in Germany. As special guest to Rea Garvey in January and February followed by appearances with Silly in May, he performed to approximately 60,000 people in a matter of months. Sheridan saw inclusion of his song The Dreamer from his debut album featured in The Hardy Bucks Movie soundtrack, album released in Ireland on 22 February.

Sheridan's new look band, now featuring Nicky Brennan on guitar, new drummer Jimmy Rainsford and Tanya O'Callaghan on bass, performed his new single Upside Down on The Late Late Show on 12 April. On 26 April, The Day You Live Forever was released in Germany through Universal Music Germany with two new songs added to its release: Upside Down and Without You. The following week the album reached the top position on the German iTunes chart and as of July 2013, is currently the highest ranked debut album by an International artist on the Official German charts. Sheridan performed his song Jigsaw on the final show of The Voice of Ireland with winner Keith Hanley on 28 April and on 3 May, he made his first German TV performance on Sat.1 breakfast television.

On 4 May, Sheridan announced that cajon player Artur Graczyk had decided to permanently leave the band and would be replaced by Jimmy Rainsford. Bass player Sean Brennan joined the band in May. Sheridan's first headline tour of Germany began in Hamburg on 7 October and finished on 29 October at The Capitol in Hanover.

On 1 November Ryan performed at the Brian O'Driscoll testimonial dinner in Dublin. Ryan's song Awake was featured on the album Simple Things for Cycle Against Suicide which was released on 15 November. Sheridan brought his successful year to an end as headliner at the New Year's Eve Countdown Concert at College Green in Dublin.

2014
The Day You Live Forever Tour continued in 2014, beginning at The Capitol in Mannheim on 15 February and finishing at The Postbahnhof, Berlin on 2 March. Following the tour, bass player Sean Brennan left the band and was replaced by Darren Sweeney. In April 2014 Sheridan and his band played in Bahrain as part of the Bahrain Irish Festival, returning to Germany on 26 April to play with a 75-piece orchestra for 6000 guests at Pop meets Classic in Braunschweig.

Sheridan wrote the song 'Home' for Mrs Brown's Boys D' Movie. The music video features Irish people (a mix of famous and not) writing what they miss about home.

2015
On 26 April Sheridan performed his new single and the title track to his second albumHere And Now on The Voice of Ireland Final Season 4. He played at the Munster final (Kerry vs Cork) on 18 July. His follow-up single, "Hearsay", reached the Top 20 on the Irish Airplay Chart. August saw Sheridan once again in Germany, appearing at Luhmühlen and Wolfsburg. Sheridan's second studio album Here And Now was released in Ireland on 28 August through Rubyworks. The album beat The Weeknd to the top spot in the Irish Album Charts. The Irish leg of the Here And Now Tour kicked off at Whelans in Dublin on 28 August with a sixteen-date tour of Germany from 12 November in Hamburg.

Discography

Albums
 The Day You Live Forever (6 May 2011) No. 2
 Here And Now (28 August 2015) No. 1

EPs
 Walking in the Air (25 November 2011)
 Ryan Sheridan Live in Cologne (14 February 2014) Germany
 Ryan Sheridan (2018)
 Spark EP (2019)

Singles
 "Jigsaw" (10 September 2010) IRE No. 11
 "The Dreamer" (15 April 2011) IRE No. 25
 "Walking in the Air" (25 November 2011) IRE No. 7
 "Stand Up Tall" (UK Radio Edit, 1 June 2012)
 "Upside Down" (12 April 2013) IRE No. 22
 "Home" (2014)
 "2 Back To 1" (12 December 2014)
 "Here and Now" (29 May 2015)
 "All of It" (2017)
 "Frozen in Time" (2017)
 "Walk Away" (2019)

Live band
Current members
 Ryan Sheridan – Lead vocals, acoustic guitar (2010–present)
 Nicky Brennan – Electric guitar, backing vocals (2012–present)
 Darren Sweeney – Bass guitar, backing vocals, keys (2014–present)
Former members
 Artur Graczyk – Percussion, cajón (2010–2013)
 Sean Brennan – Bass guitar, backing vocals (2013–2014)
 Jimmy Rainsford – Drums, percussion, cajón (2013–2015)

Touring
Since the release of Jigsaw Sheridan has been touring extensively across Ireland, Germany and the rest of Europe. In 2015 he also added Australia to his touring list.

References

External links

 Official website
 Ryan Sheridan in Concert
 Ryan Sheridan at Universal Music Germany

1982 births
Living people
Irish buskers
Irish male guitarists
Irish male songwriters
Musicians from County Monaghan
21st-century Irish male singers
21st-century guitarists